Kevin Patrick Greene (born 18 October 1958), is an Australian politician, elected as a member of the New South Wales Legislative Assembly.  He has a Diploma of Education and a Bachelor of Education and was a teacher before running for Parliament. Greene was NSW Minister for Gaming and Racing, Minister for Sport and Recreation, and Minister for Major Events.
 
Greene represented Georges River from 1999 until its abolition in 2007, when he was elected as the member for Oatley.
Greene lost his seat in the 2011 New South Wales state election. In June 2017 it was announced that Greene was standing as a Labor candidate for the Peakhurst Ward of the newly created Georges River Council. At the subsequent local government elections on 9 September 2017, he was elected in the first position as a Councillor, with the Labor ticket taking 42% of the first preference vote (1.69 quotas), enough to elect the second person on his ticket. At the first meeting of the elected council on 25 September 2017, Greene was elected unopposed as the inaugural mayor of Georges River Council.

References

 

Members of the New South Wales Legislative Assembly
1958 births
Living people
Australian Labor Party members of the Parliament of New South Wales
21st-century Australian politicians
Mayors of places in New South Wales
Recipients of the Australian Sports Medal